Damián Gerardo Salvatierra (born 17 November 1984) was an Argentine footballer.

He played for Ñublense.

References
 
 

1984 births
Living people
Argentine footballers
Argentine expatriate footballers
Villa Dálmine footballers
CSyD Tristán Suárez footballers
Club Atlético Acassuso footballers
Club Atlético Temperley footballers
Monagas S.C. players
Minervén S.C. players
Ñublense footballers
Chilean Primera División players
Expatriate footballers in Chile
Expatriate footballers in Venezuela
Association football forwards
Defensores de Belgrano de Villa Ramallo players
Club Atlético Ituzaingó players
Barracas Central players
People from Presidencia Roque Sáenz Peña
Sportspeople from Chaco Province